Carex firma is a species of sedge that grows in the mountains of southern and central Europe.

Description

Carex firma forms thick cushions.

Ecology
In synecology, Carex firma is a characteristic part of the "" (also called ""), which is an important community in the alpine zone over calcareous rock.

Taxonomy
Carex firma was first described by Nicolaus Thomas Host in 1797, in his work Synopsis Plantarum in Austria provinciisque adjacentibus sponte crescentium.

References

External links

firma
Alpine flora
Flora of the Alps
Plants described in 1797